George III (1738–1820) was King of Great Britain and Ireland from 1760 to 1820.

George III may also refer to:

People
 George III of Georgia (died 1183)
 George III, Landgrave of Leuchtenberg (1502–1555)
 George III, Prince of Anhalt-Dessau (1507–1553)
 George III, Count of Erbach-Breuberg (1548–1605)
 George III of Imereti (1605–1639)
 George III of Brieg (1611–1664)
 George III, Landgrave of Hesse-Itter (1632–1676)
 George III of Guria (died 1684)

Other uses
 George III (ship), a British convict ship wrecked in 1835
 GEORGE 3, a computer operating system from ICL

See also 
 King George (disambiguation)